Seeve is a river of Lower Saxony, Germany, a tributary of the Elbe.

The municipality of Seevetal is named after this river.

Course 

The Seeve source located is near Wehlen, south-east of Undeloh in the northern part of the Lüneburg Heath at an elevation of about 67 metres. It passes Holm, Lüllau, Jesteburg, Bendestorf, Ramelsloh, Horst, Lindhorst, Hittfeld, Karoxbostel, Glüsingen, Maschen and Hörsten. It then flows into the Elbe between Over and Wuhlenburg.

In Holm and Horst there are barrages to drive watermills. Just before joining the Elbe, the Seeve passes the natural reserve .

Water 

See also 
List of rivers of Lower Saxony

References

Rivers of Lower Saxony
Rivers of Germany